Nebraska Highway 16 is a highway in northeastern Nebraska.  Its southern terminus is southeast of Bancroft at an intersection with NE 51.  Its northern terminus is at NE 35 south of Wakefield.

Route description
Nebraska Highway 16 begins at an intersection with NE 51 and NE 1 just southeast of Bancroft.  It heads in a northwesterly direction, intersecting NE 9 south of Pender.  It turns northward, running concurrently with NE 9 before splitting off to the west just north of Pender.  It continues westward before turning to the north.  It ends at an intersection with NE 35 south of Wakefield.

History
The original Nebraska Highway 16 went from North Platte to Omaha on an alignment which follows current U.S. Highway 83 from North Platte to Stapleton and Nebraska Highway 92 from Stapleton east to Omaha.  The original designation of the current Nebraska Highway 16 was Nebraska Highway 92, but in 1936, the two highway numbers were swapped.

Major intersections

References

External links

Nebraska Roads: NE 11-20

016
Transportation in Cuming County, Nebraska
Transportation in Thurston County, Nebraska
Transportation in Wayne County, Nebraska
U.S. Route 83